= President Rajapaksa =

President Rajapaksa may refer to:

- Mahinda Rajapaksa (born 1945), 6th President of Sri Lanka (2005–2015) and brother of Gotabaya Rajapaksa
- Gotabaya Rajapaksa (born 1949), 8th President of Sri Lanka (2019-present) and brother of Mahinda Rajapaksa
